Breaking competitions at the 2024 Summer Olympics are scheduled to run from 9 to 10 August at Place de la Concorde, marking the sport's official debut in the program and the first dancesport discipline to appear in Summer Olympic history. Following its successful debut at the 2018 Summer Youth Olympics in Buenos Aires, breaking is confirmed as one of the four additional sports, along with skateboarding, sport climbing, and surfing approved for Paris 2024. The competition will witness a total of thirty-two breakdancers (sixteen B-Boys and sixteen B-Girls) stage in face-to-face single battles.

Competition format
The breaking competition will comprise two gender-based medal events (one for men and the other for women) where sixteen B-Boys and sixteen B-Girls will compete against each other in spectacular solo battles. Each breakdancer will incorporate and adapt a vast combination of powerful dance moves, namely windmills, the six-step, and freezes, improvising to the beat of DJ's tracks in a bid to accumulate the judges' scores. The breakdancer with the highest number of points scored by the judges over his or her opponent in a solo battle will advance to the next round until the first Olympic breaking champion is officially named.

Qualification

A total of 32 quota places (sixteen per gender) are available for eligible dancers to compete for the inaugural medals in breaking. NOCs can enter a maximum of four breakdancers (two per gender) across two medal events.

Over eighty percent of the total quota is attributed to a large number of breakdancers through a tripartite qualification route. First, the 2023 WDSF World Championships, scheduled for 23 to 24 September in Leuven, Belgium, will award the B-Boy and B-Girl champion with a direct quota place for Paris 2024. Second, a quintet of spots will be assigned to the highest-ranked eligible breakdancer (one B-Boy and one B-Girl) competing in each of the designated continental meets (Africa, Americas, Asia, Europe, and Oceania), respecting the two-member NOC limit. The remaining breakdancers will provide the final opportunity to book their slots for Paris 2024 through a four-month-long Olympic Qualifier Series, held between March and June 2024 in various locations worldwide. 

The host nation France reserves a spot each for a B-Boy and a B-Girl in their respective breaking events, while four more places (two per gender) are entitled to the eligible NOCs interested to have their breakdancers compete for Paris 2024 through a Universality invitation. To be registered for a spot abided by the universality principle, breakdancers must finish within the top 32 of their respective events in the final rankings of the four-month-long Olympic Qualifier Series.

Competition schedule

Medal summary

Medal table

Events

See also
 Breakdancing at the 2022 Asian Games

References

 
2024
2024 Summer Olympics events
2024 in dancesport